Bear Lake is a small lake side community in Noble Township, Noble County, in the U.S. state of Indiana.  Points of interest include Bear Lake Camp, Bear Lake Church, Elwood H. Thomas Public Beach, and Merry Lea Environmental Center.

Bear Lake Camp 
Bear Lake Camp is a Christian summer camp for students entering grades 2-12. Bear Lake Camp is a member of CCCA Bear Lake Camp is also the location of the Bear Lake Church.

Elwood H. Thomas Public Beach
The Elwood H. Thomas Public Beach is a public beach run and kept up by the East Shore Property Owners Association. It is the only privately owned public beach in the state of Indiana.

Merry Lea Environmental Center
See article: Merry Lea Environmental Center
Merry Lea Environmental Learning Center of Goshen College is located just south of Wolflake at Bear Lake in Noble County, Indiana. Merry Lea is the largest privately held land reserve in the state of Indiana. The center serves as a field laboratory for students at Goshen College who are studying ecology, environmental education and agroecology. In addition, Merry Lea provides environmental educational experiences for elementary students in the center's service area which includes the Fort Wayne metropolitan area as well as Warsaw, Huntington, Kendallville, Goshen and Elkhart.

Geography
Bear Lake is located 28 miles north-west of Fort Wayne, Indiana.

References

Unincorporated communities in Noble County, Indiana
Unincorporated communities in Indiana